"Advance/Mata Asa ga Kuru" is the forty-second single by the Japanese band Tokio. It was released on February 3, 2010, under the label J Storm. The single peaked at number five on the Oricon weekly chart. The song "Mata Asa ga Kuru" is used as a theme song to the NHK drama show Romes/Kūkō Bōkyo System. The song "Cry for the Moon" is used as a theme song for the Fuji TV drama 0 Goushitsu no Kaku. The song "Advance" is used in a commercial for Yamato Transport.

Track listing
"Advance/Mata Asa ga Kuru" was released in three different versions:

CD-only version

CD+DVD version 1

CD+DVD version 2

References

2010 singles
Tokio (band) songs
Japanese television drama theme songs
J Storm singles